The Akwa Ibom State Executive Council (also known as, the Cabinet of Akwa Ibom State) is a governmental body that plays important roles in the Government of Akwa Ibom State headed by the Governor of Akwa Ibom State. It consists of the Deputy Governor, Secretary to the State Government,Chief of Staff to the Governor, Head of Civil Service, Deputy Chief of Staff, Commissioners who preside over ministerial departments, and the Governor's special aides.

Functions
The Executive Council exists to advise and direct the Governor. Their appointment as members of the Executive Council gives them the authority to execute power over their fields.

Current cabinet
The current Executive Council is serving under the Udom Gabriel Emmanuel administration.

References

Akwa Ibom
Government of Akwa Ibom State